Kurgla is a village in Raasiku Parish, Harju County in northern Estonia.

References

Villages in Harju County